Long boom refers to various periods of economic growth, most commonly:

 The post–World War II economic expansion
 The 1990s United States boom
 The mid 1980s–2000s period, contemporary with the Great Moderation
 1991-2020 Australian economic boom